Herodias (minor planet designation: 546 Herodias) is a carbonaceous asteroid from the central regions of the asteroid belt, approximately 66 kilometers in diameter. It is an identified Eunomian interloper. It was named after the biblical character Herodias.

References

External links 
 Lightcurve plot of 546 Herodias, Palmer Divide Observatory, B. D. Warner (2009)
 (546) Herodias at AstDyS
 Asteroid Lightcurve Database (LCDB), query form (info )
 Dictionary of Minor Planet Names, Google books
 Asteroids and comets rotation curves, CdR – Observatoire de Genève, Raoul Behrend
 Discovery Circumstances: Numbered Minor Planets (1)-(5000) – Minor Planet Center
 
 

000546
Discoveries by Paul Götz
Named minor planets
000546
19041010